Ismail Timurovich Musukaev (born 28 January 1993) is a Russian freestyle wrestler of Balkar heritage, who has been representing Hungary since 2019. He represented Hungary at the 2020 Summer Olympics in Tokyo, Japan in the men's 65 kg event.

Career 

He was the runner-up at the Russian nationals in 2015 at 57 kg.

At the Russian nationals 2016 at the end of the 57 kg quarterfinal wrestling match between Lebedev and Musukaev the referees awarded the victory to Viktor Lebedev. However, after the match the Russian Championships wrestling commission considered mistakes of the referee and awarded the victory to Ismail Musukaev (4-2). Even so, Lebedev remained in the semifinals.

After the incident, the  Dagestani team walked out, along with others, including many Chechens.

At the 2019 World Wrestling Championships held in Nur-Sultan, Kazakhstan, he won one of the bronze medals in the men's freestyle 65 kg event.

At the Russian nationals 2018 he placed 2nd at 61 kilos, in the final match he lost to Magomedrasul Idrisov.

In 2020, he won the silver medal in the men's 65 kg event at the 2020 Individual Wrestling World Cup held in Belgrade, Serbia.

He won one of the bronze medals in the 65kg event at the 2022 World Wrestling Championships held in Belgrade, Serbia.

He was the runner-up at the Ivan Yarygin Grand-prix in 2015 and in 2018.

Achievements

References

External links 
 

Living people
1993 births
Russian male sport wrestlers
Hungarian male sport wrestlers
World Wrestling Championships medalists
Wrestlers at the 2020 Summer Olympics
Olympic wrestlers of Hungary
European Wrestling Champions
Sportspeople from Nalchik
21st-century Russian people
21st-century Hungarian people